Taneem Rahman Angshu (born 14 July 1981) is a National Award winning Bangladeshi film director, screenwriter, editor and CGI Artist who largely works in Bengali Films and TV productions. His first feature film Shopner Ghor (2018), was a horror film which had critical success. He won the Best Director (Bangladesh) for Shopner Ghor at 18th Telecine Award in Kolkata, India. His second film No Dorai (2019), was a major commercial success and won six national awards at Bangladesh's 33rd National Film Award (2019) including the Best Director and Best Film Category. No Dorai also won FIPRESCI at 18th Dhaka International Film Festival. Angshu also won Best Music Video Award in Channel-I Music Awards for two consecutive years, 2016 and 2017.

Career 

After simultaneously completing his graduation and 2 years of work experience with organizations like UNDP and others, he made his directorial debut with a short film titled Bhejaal (2007) that had an official screening at Dhaka International Film festival. Later he started making various TV commercials and documentaries for leading NGOs and agencies in Bangladesh.  He made his first feature-length motion picture for television titled Spook (2012) casting Bidya Sinha Mim, Anisur Rahman Milon and Azad Abul Kalam. Spook was a zombie apocalypse themed story for Channel 24. The film made a big impact, as it was the first of its kind that also pioneered using advanced CGI in TV Shows in Bangladesh. His long running directorial projects also includes many record-breaking Music Videos. In between television films, Angshu reintroduced a new style of Music Video in Bangladesh that made him distinguished. This followed a number of successful award winning music videos which contributed to a new strong platform in Music Video Industry in Bangladesh. Till date, most of the highest viewed Bangladeshi music video in various Youtube Channels is directed by Angshu.

Telefilms like Ami Trina o Magic (2012) with Nusrat Imrose Tisha and Abdur Noor Shajal, was well received by viewers. Aalo (2014) was his first acclaimed horror telefilm starring Aupee Karim and Partha Barua. Telefilms like Hothat Tomar Jonno (2014) with Tahsan Khan, Life and Fiona (2014) with Arfan Nisho and Sharlin Farzana, Ongsher Shesh Ektai (2014) with Mishu Sabbir, Tawsif Mahbub and Shabnam Faria are amongst notable project. Air Bender (2015) was his first multi starred telefilm with Ziaul Faruk Apurba, Tariq Anam Khan, Siam Ahmed, Mumtaheena Chowdhury Toya, Suzena Zafar and Sharlin Farzana. Airbender was the first telefilm in Bangladesh that had been shot inside an actual commercial aircraft.  Followed by over 30 successful TV Dramas and Telefilms, he came up with his first mega TV series: The Daily Fright Night (2015), consisting over 200 episodes for Gazi TV. Alongside numerous TV shows, Angshu directed number of successful music videos like Aahare (2014) by Minar Rahman, Hariye Fela Bhalobasha (2015) by Habib Wahid, Jhoom (2016) by Minar Rahman, Local Bus (2016) by Pritom Hassan, Beiaainshaab (2016) by Pritom Hassan, Moner Thikana (2016) by Habib Wahid, Jadukor (2017) by Pritom Hassan, Ta Jani Na (2017) by Minar Rahman, Ghum (2017) by Habib Wahid, Cholo Na (2018) by Habib Wahid, Amar E Mon (2018) by Imran Mahmudul, Girlfriend Er Biya (2018) by Pritom Hasan and Protic Hasan are amongst many other hits. Angshu consecutively received two Channel-I Music Awards for best music video for Hariye Fela Bhalobasha and Jhoom respectively for the year 2016 and 2017.

Angshu's first directorial released feature film Shopner Ghor (2018) starring Zakia Bari Mamo and Anisur Rahman Milon is a classic horror film which brought him an award at the 18th Telecine Award in Kolkata, India. His most recent feature film No Dorai (2019), produced by Star Cineplex and starring Sunerah Binte Kamal and Sariful Razz. The story inspired by a champion female surfer from Cox's Bazar. The film won 6 National Awards in 2020, including Best Film and Best Director. Angshu has also received FIPRESCI award at 18th Dhaka International Film Festival. Angshu is the second Bangladeshi director to win this award after renowned filmmaker Tareque Masud. No Dorai is selected for the Asia Pacific Screen Awards 2020 (APSA) Brisbane, Australia. Aadi (2015) his first shot feature film is yet to be released.

Filmography

Awards and honors 
 Channel-I Music Awards in Best Music Video category – 2016
 Channel-I Music Awards in Best Music Video category – 2017
 18th Telecine Award – 2018
 National Film Award – 2020
 FIPRESCI Award – 2020

References

Living people
Bangladeshi film directors
Bangladeshi television directors
Best Director National Film Award (Bangladesh) winners
Place of birth missing (living people)
1981 births